Sergius of Tella was the Patriarch of Antioch and head of the Syriac Orthodox Church from c. 544 to c. 547 or c. 557 to 560.

Biography
Sergius was born at Tella, and was a friend of Jacob Baradaeus. He became a monk at the monastery of Hala, and was ordained a priest by the bishop John of Anazarbus. As a monk, Sergius accepted the doctrine of tritheism, and accompanied Jacob Baradaeus to Constantinople in 527. At Constantinople, Sergius tutored Empress Theodora's grandson Athanasius, and became a friend of John Philoponus, who wrote a non-Chalcedonian treatise named "A Treatise Concerning the Whole and the Parts" at Sergius' request.

Jacob Baradaeus, who had become Bishop of Edessa, consecrated Sergius as patriarch of Antioch at Constantinople, thus cementing the schism in the church of Antioch into the non-Chalcedonian Syriac Orthodox Church and Chalcedonian Imperial Church. Sources disagree on the date of Sergius' consecration as patriarch. According to the Zuqnin Chronicle, he was consecrated in 544, whereas John of Ephesus in his Ecclesiastical History dates the consecration to 557. Sergius resided at Constantinople for the duration of his term as patriarch, for which he was later erroneously termed patriarch of Constantinople by the 14th-century historian Nikephoros Kallistos Xanthopoulos in his Ecclesiastical History. He died a natural death, either in 547 as per the Zuqnin Chronicle, or in 560 as per John of Ephesus.

References

Bibliography

Syriac Patriarchs of Antioch from 512 to 1783
6th-century deaths
Year of birth missing
6th-century Oriental Orthodox archbishops
People of Roman Syria
6th-century Byzantine bishops
6th-century Syriac Orthodox Church bishops